Karl Theophil Fries (13 March 1875 – 6 September 1962) was a German chemist.

Life
After his family moved to Frankfurt he went to school there, but chose to study chemistry at the near University of Marburg in 1894.
After one year in Darmstadt University of Technology to improve his skills in electrochemistry he received his Ph.D with Theodor Zincke back at the University of Marburg in 1899. He became a professor in Marburg until the retirement of Theodor Zincke and the start of World War I in 1914. He took part as a soldier in World War I from 1914 till 1918. He became a professor at the Technical University at Brunswick in 1918 and stayed there until a conflict with some Nazi habilitants in 1938. After his forced retirement in 1938 he went back to Marburg where he was able to teach chemistry at the university. Karl Fries died on 6 September 1962 in Marburg and was buried near his academic advisor Theodor Zincke.

Accomplishments
Fries is noted for the discovery of the Fries rearrangement, which is an important reaction used in Organic synthesis.

References

1875 births
1962 deaths
20th-century German chemists
Academic staff of the Technical University of Braunschweig
Technische Universität Darmstadt alumni
Scientists from Frankfurt